David Yates (born 1963) is an English filmmaker.

David Yates may also refer to:

 David Gilbert Yates (1870–1918), otorhinolaryngologist
 David Peel Yates (1911–1978), military officer
 David Yates (legal scholar) (born 1946), solicitor and Warden of Robinson College, Cambridge
 David Yates (judge), Australian judge
David Yates (politician), Kentucky lawyer and politician

See also
 David Anthony Yates (1930–2004), rheumatologist
 Yates (surname)